The Triouzoune is a  long river in the Corrèze département, south-central France. It flows generally south-southeast. It is a right tributary of the Dordogne into which it flows between Neuvic and Sérandon.

Communes along its course
This list is ordered from source to mouth: Saint-Sulpice-les-Bois, Saint-Germain-Lavolps, Meymac, Alleyrat, Saint-Angel, Valiergues, Palisse, Neuvic, Liginiac, Sérandon

References

Rivers of France
Rivers of Corrèze
Rivers of Nouvelle-Aquitaine